Jacob David Tamarkin (Yakov Davidovich Tamarkin; 11 July 1888 – 18 November 1945) was a Russian-American mathematician best known for his work in mathematical analysis.

Biography 
Tamarkin was born in Chernihiv, Imperial Russia to a wealthy Jewish family. His father, David Tamarkin, was a physician and his mother, Sophie Krassilschikov, was from a family of a landowner. He shares a common ancestor with the Van Leer family, sometimes spelled Von Löhr or Valar. He moved to St. Petersburg as a child and grew up there. In high school, he befriended Alexander Friedmann, a future cosmologist, with whom he wrote his first mathematics paper in 1906, and remained friends and colleagues until Friedmann's sudden death in 1925. 
Vladimir Smirnov was his other friend from the same gymnasium. Many years later, they coauthored a popular textbook titled "A course in higher mathematics".

Tamarkin studied in St. Petersburg University where he defended his dissertation in 1917. His advisor was Andrei Markov. After the graduation, Tamarkin worked at the Communication Institute and Electrotechnical Institute. In 1919 he temporarily became a professor and a dean at Perm State University, but a year later returned to St. Petersburg where he received a professorship at St. Petersburg Polytechnical University.

In 1925 he became worried about Russia's stability and decided to emigrate to the United States. His favorite memory was the examination in analytic geometry he had to do with an American consul in Riga, when he tried to prove his identity. In the U.S., he became a lecturer at Dartmouth College. In 1927, Tamarkin received a professorship at Brown University where he remained until his retirement in 1945, after suffering a heart attack. He died later that year in Bethesda, Maryland, a suburb of Washington, D.C.

Tamarkin's work spanned a number of areas, including number theory, integral equations, Fourier series, complex analysis, moment problem, boundary value problem and differential equations. He was a proponent and a founding co-editor of the Mathematical Reviews (which was based at Brown at that time), together with Otto Neugebauer and William Feller. He was also an active supporter of the American Mathematical Society, a member of the council starting 1931, and a vice-president in 1942–43. He had over twenty doctoral students at Brown, including Dorothy Lewis Bernstein, Nelson Dunford, George Forsythe, Margaret Gurney and Derrick Lehmer.

Tamarkin was married to Helene Weichardt (1888–1934) who came from a wealthy family of German ancestry. Their son, Paul Tamarkin (1922–1977), was a physicist for RAND Corporation.

Notes

References 
 Jacob David Tamarkin—His life and work, by Einar Hille, Bull. Amer. Math. Soc. Volume 53, Number 5 (1947), 440–457.
 Tamarkin, Jacob D., an article in Encyclopedia Brunoniana
 Tamarkin's biography (in Russian)

External links
 
 
 Tamarkin's mathematical school  (in Russian)
 Jacob David Tamarkin, Mathematical Reviews history page (with a photo).

20th-century American mathematicians
1888 births
1945 deaths
People from Chernihiv
Saint Petersburg State University alumni
Academic staff of Perm State University
Brown University faculty
Dartmouth College faculty
Russian Social Democratic Labour Party members
Mathematicians from the Russian Empire
Soviet mathematicians
American people of Russian descent
People from Bethesda, Maryland
Soviet emigrants to the United States